Vereinigte Astronomische Gesellschaft (VAG) was an international astronomical society founded in 1800.

History 
International cooperation in astronomy started with a first meeting of 15 European astronomers in Gotha in 1798. The society was founded two years in Lilienthal, near Bremen, to organize the compilation of ecliptic star charts, with more than half of the members originated from non-German speaking countries. In the same year Monatliche Correspondenz (monthly correspondence) was founded in 1800 by Franz Xaver von Zach to publish results.

In 1845, the society published the Berliner Akademische Sternkarten (Berlin academic star maps).

See also 
 Astronomische Gesellschaft
 List of astronomical societies
 Celestial police

References

Further reading 
 Wolfgang R. Dick, Jürgen Hamel (ed.): Astronomie von Olbers bis Schwarzschild. Nationale Entwicklungen und internationale Beziehungen im 19. Jahrhundert. (Acta Historica Astronomiae ; 14). Thun ; Frankfurt am Main: Deutsch, 2002, 243 p., 
 Internationality from the VAG (1800) to the Astronomische Gesellschaft.

Astronomy organizations
Organizations established in 1800